Reluctant Hero is the second studio album by American heavy metal band Killer Be Killed. It was released on November 20, 2020, by Nuclear Blast.

Writing
The band began writing the album in 2016, before going to Hybrid Studios in California in 2018 to record the music. They then finished recording the vocals in 2019.

Cover artwork
In an interview, guitarist Max Cavalera discussed the origins of the album cover: "I'm really happy with how it came out, because I wasn't happy with the first one. I have a lot of these National Geographic magazines at home, and one had a story about haunted places in America. One of them was this cemetery in Cleveland, which has this really cool statue of an angel with a sword. I thought it would look so badass on an album cover — it almost looks like black metal — so I suggested to our label to find someone to go over and take a picture of the statue."

Singles
On September 4, 2020, Killer Be Killed announced the release of the album, along with the first single "Deconstructing Self-Construction".

The second single "Dream Gone Bad" was released on October 13, 2020.

On November 6, 2020, the third single "Inner Calm from Outer Storms" was released. In a press release, bass guitarist Troy Sanders said the single is "about having the ability to sense a distant or unseen target. It explores a journey of reckless abandon where the destination may, or may not, actually exist." The single also featured on Consequence of Sound's Top 30 Metal & Hard Rock Songs of 2020.

The fourth single, "From a Crowded Wound", was released on November 20, 2020, the same day as the album release.

Critical reception

Reluctant Hero was met with generally favorable reviews from critics. Aggregator Album of the Year gave the release a 78 out of 100 based on a critical consensus of six reviews.

Max Heilman of Exclaim! said the songs on the release are "elevating poppy ideas with explosive, multilayered musicality and hard-hitting emotion. Reluctant Hero proves metal can be catchy without being stupid."

Accolades

Track listing

Charts

Credits
 Greg Puciato – guitars, vocals
 Max Cavalera – guitars, vocals
 Troy Sanders – bass, vocals
 Ben Koller – drums
 Josh Wilbur – production, mixing, engineering
 Nick Rowe – engineering
 Cameron Rae – assistant engineering
 Ted Jensen – mastering
 Monte Conner – A&R
 Gerardo Martinez – A&R
 Gloria Cavalera – management
 Ryan J. Downey – management
 Marcelo Vasco – cover artwork, design
 Hannah Verbeuren – band photography

References

External links
 Official website

2020 albums
Killer Be Killed albums
Nuclear Blast albums